= Surulacode Gram Panchayat =

Village in Tamil Nadu, India

Surulacode Surula code
- Village Panchayat
- Location in Tamil Nadu, India Surulacode (India)
- Coordinates: 8.340060°N 77.375880°E
- Country: India
- State: Tamil Nadu
- District: Kanyakumari District

Population (2011)
  - Total: 4,753

Languages
  - Official: Tamil
- Time zone: UTC+5:30 (IST)
- Postal code: 629164
- Vehicle registration: TN 74

Surulacode Village Panchayat (Surulacode Gram Panchayat), is located in Tiruvattaru Circle, Kanyakumari district of Tamil Nadu This panchayat falls under Padmanabhapuram assembly constituency and Kanyakumari Lok Sabha constituency. This panchayat has a total of 7 panchayat constituencies. 7 Panchayat Council members are elected from these. As per 2011 India census, the total population is 4753. Among them there are 2376 females and 2377 males.

== Basic facilities ==
The following information has been compiled according to the 2015 data of the Tamil Nadu Rural Development and Panchayat Department.

Basic Facilities	Total No.
Water Connections	178
Bore Motor Pump	18
Hand Pump	6
Upper level reservoir tanks	9
Bottom level reservoir tanks	1
Local government buildings	31
Government school buildings	
Ponds or wells	2
Play Ground	
Vegetable market	
Panchayat Union Roads	105
Panchayat Roads	12
Bus stand	
Graveyard or Incinerations	1

== Villages ==
List of villages located in this panchayat:

1. Veerapuli
2. Chellanthiruthi
3. Kalikesam
4. Kanchikuzhi
5. Kuvai Kadu Malai
6. Mukkampalai
7. Panniyodu
8. Surulacode
9. Paraliyaru
